Dylan George (born 27 June 1998) is a Dutch professional football player who plays as a winger.

Club career 
George is a youth exponent from FC Twente. He made his Eredivisie debut at 4 March 2017 against Willem II in a 2–1 home win.

In 2021 he moved to Bulgaria where he took part in a trial with Levski Sofia, but later signed with the Second League team Spartak Varna. Since returning from injury, he made his debut for Spartak II on 24 October 2021 in the Third league match against Svetkavitsa Targovishte scoring a goal. In January 2022 he was released from the club.

Career statistics

Statistics accurate as of last match played on May 14, 2017.

References

External links
 
 

1998 births
Living people
Sportspeople from Beverwijk
Association football wingers
Dutch footballers
FC Twente players
Helmond Sport players
HHC Hardenberg players
Eredivisie players
Eerste Divisie players
Derde Divisie players
Footballers from North Holland
Dutch expatriate sportspeople in Bulgaria
Dutch expatriate footballers
Expatriate footballers in Bulgaria
FC Spartak Varna players
Jong FC Twente players